Group Captain Clifford Arthur Bowman Wilcock,  (28 April 1898 – 14 January 1962) was a British engineer, company director and politician who is noted for his contributions to civil and military aviation.

Great War service
Born in Luton, Bedfordshire, Wilcock was educated at St Dunstan's College in Catford. He had joined the 14th London Regiment (London Scottish) in 1912 and served with them in the First World War, later transferring to the Queen's Royal West Surrey Regiment. Wounded at Ypres, he was seconded into the Royal Flying Corps in June 1917 on his recovery, and he became a founding member of the Royal Air Force. He won the Air Force Cross in 1919.

Royal Air Force
At the end of the war Wilcock studied engineering at the University of Edinburgh before rejoining the RAF with no. 208 Squadron in Egypt and Constantinople from 1921 to 1923. He alternated between home postings dealing with administration, and engineering work on RAF bases (including in Iraq until 1932). Among his posts was assisting at the Experimental Establishment in Felixstowe. From July 1935 he was on administrative duties at Ruislip, where he founded one of the first Royal Air Force Volunteer Reserve Squadrons in 1937.

Second World War
Retiring in September 1938 with the rank of Group Captain, Wilcock became a broker and underwriter at Lloyd's of London. He was a Freeman of the City of London. On the outbreak of the Second World War he offered his services and was made an Air Ministry civil servant (deputy director of Manning), and ultimately rose to Senior Personnel
Officer for RAF Transport Command. He was awarded the OBE in 1944.

Parliament
A member of the Labour Party and the Fabian Society since 1921, Wilcock was chosen in February 1945 as one of the Labour candidates for Derby, a two-member constituency. He and his fellow candidate Philip Noel-Baker won the seat in the 1945 general election with majorities over 20,000. After the Boundary Commission split Derby into two single-member seats, Wilcock was elected for Derby North from 1950.

He specialised in aviation issues, and was Chairman of a departmental committee on training and recruitment for civil aviation from 1946 to 1949. He was also made a Director of several aviation companies, including Derby Aviation. Moderate in his politics, Wilcock was not a frequent speaker in the House of Commons, but he was respected for his knowledge of his subject. He was made a Fellow of the Royal Aeronautical Society and also developed an interest in health, being a member of the Medical Research Council and a Governor of Westminster Hospital.

He had six children. He died in Westminster.

References
Obituary, The Times, 15 January 1962.

External links

1898 births
1962 deaths
Military personnel from Bedfordshire
People educated at St Dunstan's College
Alumni of the University of Edinburgh
Fellows of the Royal Aeronautical Society
Labour Party (UK) MPs for English constituencies
Royal Air Force officers
Recipients of the Air Force Cross (United Kingdom)
Members of the Parliament of the United Kingdom for constituencies in Derbyshire
UK MPs 1945–1950
UK MPs 1950–1951
UK MPs 1951–1955
UK MPs 1955–1959
UK MPs 1959–1964
People from Luton
British Army personnel of World War I
Queen's Royal Regiment officers
Royal Flying Corps officers
London Scottish officers
Royal Air Force personnel of World War II